Miner Memorial Library is the public library of Lempster, New Hampshire, located at 3 Second New Hampshire Turnpike.  The library occupies a single-story wood-frame structure built in 1845 as a church for a Universalist congregation. Despite significant alteration for its use as a library, the building remains a fine example of vernacular church architecture in Sullivan County. Under the name First Universalist Chapel, the building was listed on the National Register of Historic Places in December 2006, and the New Hampshire State Register of Historic Places in January 2006.

Architecture and history
The Miner Memorial Library is located in the village center of East Lempster, at the southwest corner of New Hampshire Route 10 and the 2nd New Hampshire Turnpike.  It is a -story wood-frame structure, with a gabled roof and clapboarded exterior.  It is finely trimmed, but lacking in details that indicate any particular architectural style, other than a Federal style fan in the front gable.  The main facade is three bays wide, with a center entrance framed by simple moulding with corner blocks.

The building was constructed in 1845 for a Universalist congregation that had probably existed since the 1830s.  During the congregation's ownership, relatively few alterations were made, most notably the addition of some windows and electrification in 1941.  The building was formally dedicated in 1927 to the memory of Lempster native Alonzo Ames Miner, a leading Universalist minister and president of Tufts College.  By the late 1940s the congregation had shrunk to the point that only summer services were held here, and in 1964 its trustees offered the building to the town.

See also
National Register of Historic Places listings in Sullivan County, New Hampshire

References

Churches on the National Register of Historic Places in New Hampshire
Georgian architecture in New Hampshire
Churches completed in 1845
19th-century Unitarian Universalist church buildings
Churches in Sullivan County, New Hampshire
New Hampshire State Register of Historic Places
Libraries in Sullivan County, New Hampshire
Former churches in New Hampshire
National Register of Historic Places in Sullivan County, New Hampshire
Lempster, New Hampshire